Caesium dodecaborate is an inorganic compound with the formula Cs2B12H12. It is a salt composed of caesium and dodecaborate(12) ions. The [B12H12]2− anion has been of great theoretical interest to the chemistry community.

Structure
The [B12H12]2− anion's B12 core is a regular icosahedron. The [B12H12]2− as a whole also has icosahedral molecular symmetry, and it belongs to the molecular point group Ih. Its icosahedral shape is consistent with the classification of this cage as "closo" in polyhedral skeletal electron pair theory.

Crystals of Cs2B12H12 feature Cs+ ions in contact with twelve hydrides provided by four B12H122−. The B-B bond distances are 178 pm, and the B-H distances are 112 pm. Many other salts are known.

Preparation
The dodecaborate anion was first prepared in modest yield by Pitochelli and Hawthorne from iododecarborane. It is more conventienly prepared in two steps from sodium borohydride. First the borohydride is converted into a triborate anion using the etherate of boron trifluoride:
4 NaBH4 + BF3 → NaB3H8 + 3 NaF + 4 H2

Pyrolysis of the triborate gives the twelve boron cluster as the sodium salt, which is then treated with caesium hydroxide to precipitate Cs2B12H12.

Reactions and proposed applications
Salts of B12H122− have been investigated for boron neutron capture therapy and as fuels for airbags.

Salts of B12H122− are precursors to related derivatives including B12(OH)122− and B12(CH3)122−. This closo boron hydride resists degradation more so than the isoelectronic carboranes.

See also
 Neutron capture therapy of cancer

References

Boron compounds
Caesium compounds
Boranes